A military volunteer (or war volunteer) is a person who enlists in military service by free will, and is not a conscript, mercenary, or a foreign legionnaire. Volunteers sometimes enlist to fight in the armed forces of a foreign country, for example during the Spanish Civil War. Military volunteers are essential for the operation of volunteer militaries. Many armies, including the U.S. Army, formerly distinguished between "Important Volunteers" enlisted during a war, and "regulars" who served on long-term basis.

United States

In the United States troops raised as state militia were always described as "volunteers", even when recruited by conscription. Both US volunteers and regulars were referred to as "U.S." troops. The rank of an officer in a volunteer unit was separate from his rank (if any) as a regular, and usually higher. When the volunteer forces were disbanded at the end of the war, officers with both kinds of commission reverted to their "regular" rank. For instance, George Armstrong Custer became a brigadier general of volunteers during the American Civil War, but when the war ended, he reverted to captain. (He was later promoted to lieutenant colonel.) Volunteer rank is not the same as brevet rank.

See also
Volunteer military
Volunteer Force, volunteer units in the 19th century British Empire
Sar-El, national project for volunteers for Israel
SAF Volunteer Corps, volunteer scheme for the Singapore Armed Forces
Foreign involvement in the Spanish Civil War
Corpo Truppe Volontarie
Wehrmacht foreign volunteers and conscripts
International Freedom Battalion, units consisting of foreign fighters partaking in the war against the Islamic State of Iraq and the Levant
Volunteering in a non-military context means working voluntarily without pay

External links

Notes

Military sociology